
Gmina Łaziska is a rural gmina (administrative district) in Opole Lubelskie County, Lublin Voivodeship, in eastern Poland.

Villages
Gmina Łaziska contains the villages and settlements of Braciejowice, Głodno, Grabowiec, Janiszów, Kamień, Kępa Gostecka, Kępa Piotrawińska, Kępa Solecka, Koło, Kolonia-Kamień, Kopanina Kaliszańska, Kopanina Kamieńska, Kosiorów, Las Dębowy, Łaziska, Łaziska-Kolonia, Niedźwiada Duża, Niedźwiada Mała, Piotrawin, Piotrawin-Kolonia, Trzciniec, Wojciechów, Wrzelów, Zakrzów and Zgoda.

Neighbouring gminas
Gmina Łaziska is bordered by the gminas of Chotcza, Józefów nad Wisłą, Karczmiska, Opole Lubelskie, Solec nad Wisłą and Wilków.

References

 Polish official population figures 2006

Laziska
Opole Lubelskie County